Yale High School is a public secondary school in Yale, Oklahoma, United States. It is located at 315 East Chicago Avenue in Yale, Oklahoma and the only high school in Yale Public Schools.

Extracurricular activities

Clubs and organizations

4-H
FCA
FFA
National Honor Society
Quiz Bowl
Student Council
SWAT
Yearbook

Athletics
Baseball
Basketball
Softball
Track and Field
Football
Volleyball

References

External links
 

Public high schools in Oklahoma
Schools in Payne County, Oklahoma